The Cincinnati–West Virginia rivalry is a college sports rivalry between the University of Cincinnati Bearcats and West Virginia University Mountaineers, which are about  apart. The rivalry dates from their first college football game in 1921, and has continued across all sports, including basketball since 1940. The rivalry intensified while the two schools were conference foes and members of the Big East Conference from 2005 to 2011.

History

The schools have not played since West Virginia left the Big East for the Big 12 in 2012. Cincinnati remained in the Big East, which became the American Athletic Conference in 2013. Cincinnati was later invited on September 10, 2021, into the Big 12 Conference, starting in 2023–24 season. To continue the series between the two schools, the Big 12 announced a protective rivalry between the two in the conference's future.

In men's basketball both Gale Catlett and Bob Huggins were successful head coaches at both institutions.

Football

Notable games
November 17, 2007: West Virginia had momentum as the No. 5 ranked team in the nation, and Cincinnati was ranked No. 21 after back-to-back wins against ranked opponents No. 20 USF and No. 16 Connecticut. West Virginia was able to hold on for a victory by defeating No. 21 Cincinnati 28-23 to keep its Big East title hopes alive.

November 13, 2009: Cincinnati was undefeated with a 9-0 record and ranked No. 5, the Bearcats seeking a second consecutive Big East Championship. West Virginia was ranked No. 23. Cincinnati would hold off the Mountaineers to remain undefeated, beating West Virginia 24-21, which helped propel Cincinnati to the 2010 Sugar Bowl.

Game results
Rankings are from the AP Poll (1936–present), CFP Poll (2014–present)

Men's basketball

Notable games
March 14, 1998: In the round of 32 of the 1998 NCAA tournament #2 Seed Cincinnati would take the lead with 7.1 seconds remaining in the second half before the #10 Seed Mountaineers stormed back down the court and took the lead back with their own 3-point shot, upsetting the Bearcats 75–74.

January 30, 2008: In his first game at West Virginia facing his former school, Bob Huggins lost to his former assistant coach Mick Cronin as Cincinnati beat the Mountaineers 62–39 in Morgantown.

Game results
Rankings are from the AP Poll (1936–present)

Notes

A1998 NCAA Round of 32
B2010 Big East men's basketball tournament

See also 
 List of NCAA college football rivalry games

References

College basketball rivalries in the United States
College football rivalries in the United States
Cincinnati Bearcats football
Cincinnati Bearcats men's basketball
West Virginia Mountaineers football
West Virginia Mountaineers men's basketball